Christopher Forbis is a Funimation script writer and voice actor who was very prominent in the script writing to the Dragon Ball franchise since Funimation first licensed the series in 1995. Chris is also friends with the former owner of Funimation, Daniel Cocanougher.

English dubbing roles
Baki the Grappler - Tubby
Blue Gender - Soldiers, Various Characters
Case Closed - Charles (ep 27), Francis (ep 4), Hyde (ep 77)
Dragon Ball - Dr. Brief, Various Characters
Dragon Ball GT - Dodoria
Dragon Ball Z - Dr. Brief, Dodoria, Various Characters
Dragon Ball Z: Bardock - The Father of Goku - Dodoria
Dragon Ball Z - Movie: Broly - The Legendary Super Saiyan - Dr. Brief
Dragon Ball Z - Movie: Fusion Reborn - Dodoria
The Galaxy Railways - Rigel Captain (ep. 24)
Yu Yu Hakusho - Genbu

References

American male writers
Place of birth missing (living people)
Year of birth missing (living people)
Living people
American male voice actors